Bortons is a small settlement on the southern bank of the Waitaki River in New Zealand's South Island. It is located on SH 83, 7 km east of Duntroon.

The settlement is named after surveyor and civil engineer John Borton, a pioneer of the district, who acquired a nearby run in 1854.

Bortons Pond, the headwaters of the lower Waitaki irrigation scheme, is located at Black Point, to the east of Bortons.

Bortons lends its name to the Bortonian stage, one of the divisions of the New Zealand geologic time scale.

References

Populated places in Canterbury, New Zealand
Waitaki District